Junon may refer to:

 Juno (mythology), in French
 Junon (magazine) is a monthly Japanese fashion magazine
French ship Junon - Ten ships of the French Navy have borne this name, the last one decommissioned in 1996. 
HMS Junon - The Royal Navy retained the name for several French ships of that name that it captured and brought into the Service